Peters's fruit bat (Cynopterus luzoniensis) is a species of megabat within the family Pteropodidae. It is found in Sulawesi, Philippines, and adjacent small islands.

References

Further reading
Don E. Wilson & Deeann, and M. Reeder, 2005: Mammal Species of the World: A Taxonomic and Geographic Reference. Third Edition. The Johns Hopkins University Press, Baltimore
Peters. 1861. Monatsberichte der Koniglich Preussischen Akademie der Wissenschaften zu Berlin, 1861: 708.
Conservation status: IUCN link: Cynopterus luzoniensis (Not Evaluated)
Cynopterus luzoniensis on Mammal Species of the World.

Cynopterus
Mammals described in 1861
Taxa named by Wilhelm Peters